Chambishi Stadium is a multi-use stadium in Chambishi, Zambia.  It is currently used mostly for football matches and serves as the home for Chambishi F.C. of the Zambian Premier League.  The stadium holds 5,000 people.

External links
Stadium information 

Football venues in Zambia
Buildings and structures in Copperbelt Province